Roberto Pérez is a Puerto Rican professional baseball catcher. Roberto Pérez may also refer to the following notable people:
Carlos Roberto Pérez (born 1968), Mexican football manager and former player
Roberto Guerra Perez (born 1978), Cuban journalist and blogger
Roberto Iglesias Pérez, Puerto Rican politician
Roberto Mena Pérez (born 1984), Spanish wheelchair basketball player
Robert Pérez (baseball) (born 1969), Venezuelan baseball outfielder 
Roberto Pérez (Bolivian footballer) (born 1960), Bolivian football player
Roberto Pérez (Paraguayan footballer), Paraguayan football manager and former player
Roberto Pérez de Alva (born 1953), Mexican politician
Rubby Perez (born Roberto Antonio Pérez Herrera in 1956), Dominican merengue singer